ESOFT Metro Campus (previously known as ESOFT Computer Studies) is a private sector educational institute or college located in Colombo, Sri Lanka. It offers academic and professional qualifications in Computing, Business & Management, Engineering, Hospitality and English. Established in the year 2000, the company today has 40 branches nationwide.  It is headed by Dr. Dayan Rajapakse.

Early years 
ESOFT was established in Kirilapone (which is a suburban area of Colombo, Sri Lanka), and initially offered training services for students that were preparing for the BCS (UK) Professional Examinations.  They subsequently moved to their present location in Bambalapitiya (Colombo) which is a hub for IT training in Sri Lanka .

Programmes 
Programmes taught at ESOFT Metro Campus are organised into five schools or divisions. These are: School of Computing, School of Business, School of Engineering and Technology, School of Hospitality Management and the Language Academy.

School of Computing
Degree programmes available at the ESOFT School of Computing include the Bachelors in Information Technology (BIT) awarded by the University of Colombo School of Computing (UCSC) and the BSc (Hons) in Computing and BEng (Hons) in Software Engineering awarded by the London Metropolitan University.

Students can also opt to follow professional qualifications such as the Certificate, Diploma and Post Graduate Diploma (PGD) awarded by the British Computer Society (BCS - Chartered Institute of IT) and the BTEC Higher National Diploma (HND) in Computing and Systems Development awarded by Edexcel.

In addition, ESOFT also conducts several vendor certification programmes including those for Microsoft, Cisco and Oracle.

School of Business
The ESOFT School of Business conducts classes for both Bachelors and Masters level Business Administration qualifications awarded by the London Metropolitan University.

Students can also opt to follow professional qualifications such as the BTEC Higher National Diploma (HND) in Business Management awarded by Edexcel.

School of Engineering and Technology
The ESOFT School of Engineering and Technology conducts classes for both Bachelors and Masters level qualifications in Mechanical Engineering, Electrical and Electronic Engineering, Civil Engineering and Construction Management. These are awarded by the Kingston University London.

School of Hospitality Management
The ESOFT School of Hospitality Management offers professional qualifications such as the BTEC HNDs in Travel and Tourism Management and Hospitality Management awarded by Edexcel.

Language Academy
The language academy offers Pearson Assured courses in both academic and professional English.

Recognition 
Although ESOFT started teaching for the BCS Exams in 2000, ESOFT was designated as an Accredited Course Provider of the BCS in the year 2007, in recognition of the standards that are maintained in the course delivery. ESOFT is the only organisation in the world to be accredited for all three levels of the BCS Higher Education Qualifications (as at November 2010).  ESOFT has also produced several prize winners (high achievers) over the past few years for the BCS and BIT programmes 

The University of Moratuwa has signed a Memorandum of Understanding with ESOFT appointing it as a Collaborative Partner for offering the Bachelor of Information Technology (BIT) External Degree.  Such an appointment is made after an extensive evaluation process and ESOFT is one of only three such partners to be appointed.  ESOFT currently conducts the BIT programme in Colombo, Kandy, Kurunegala, and Jaffna.  As of 2011, the University of Moratuwa has stopped conducting the programme online and is working purely via the partner mode.

Edexcel (UK) has Accredited ESOFT to conduct the Higher National Diploma (HND) Programmes in Computing since 2009 and Business Management since 2010.

In September 2019, ESOFT Metro Campus Colombo was recognised by the Ministry of Higher Education and the University Grants Commission (UGC) as a Non State Degree Awarding Institution.  This means that ESOFT can officially award their own degrees.  The first degree to be introduced was the Bachelor of Information Technology Honours degree.  The Bachelor of Business Management Honours degree was approved in 2021 with the first intake scheduled for 2022 February.

Partnerships & Affiliations 
 In 2007, ESOFT was appointed as an Accredited Course Provider of the BCS for the HEQ Professional Examinations (UK).  This is especially noteworthy since ESOFT is the only organisation to be accredited for all three levels of the Higher Education Qualifications (HEQ), in the World.
 In 2009, ESOFT was appointed as an Approved Centre of Edexcel, for conducting their Level 5 programmes in Sri Lanka.
 In 2010, ESOFT entered into an agreement with the University of Moratuwa, to be appointed as a Collaborative Partner of the University for offering the Bachelor of IT External Degree.
 In 2012, ESOFT partnered with Kingston University UK to offer undergraduate and postgraduate qualifications in various disciplines of Engineering.  Later, this partnership was expanded to cover undergraduate and postgraduate qualifications in IT.
 In 2013, ESOFT entered into a strategic and exclusive partnership with London Metropolitan University, UK to offer their undergraduate and postgraduate qualifications in Sri Lanka.
 In 2021, ESOFT and Virtusa signed a MoU under their Campus Reach initiative, to provide internship and training opportunities for undergraduate students of ESOFT. 
 In 2021, ESOFT partnered with TheSmartBridge in Singapore, to offer project-based training for undergraduate students in IT.  ‘Smart Internz’ is a global platform of academia and corporate, giving a complete training of transforming the knowledge into work experience via Guided Projects and Externship programmes.

CSR Activities 

ESOFT is involved in several Corporate Social Responsibility activities and one of the most recent is their platinum level sponsorship of the Edex 2011 Education and Careers Expo held in January 2011. ESOFT also has a Mobile Unit - a bus fitted with 20 workstations - which is sent to rural areas and to schools to provide positive experiences to students who may not have even seen or used a computer before.

As of 2012, ESOFT has been a co-sponsor of the Royal College Blue & Gold Hockey 7's Tournament which is organised with the participation of school teams from around the nation 

In 2015, ESOFT started the E-Thilina project in partnership with Sirasa TV. The aim of the project was to donate complete computing labs to deserving and rural schools so as to provide children with the opportunity to learn IT/ICT at an early age.  The project was continued into the year 2016 as well.  Each lab consists of a minimum of 8 modern networked PC's along with a Laser Printer.  Tables and Chairs and Carpeting are also provided, with the complete cost borne by ESOFT.  Sirasa TV provides coverage via their media network.  Two of the computer labs were opened by the President of Sri Lanka, Hon mohomed munshid.  The E-Thilina project was concluded in 2018 after a successful run of 3 years where 33 computer labs were donated to public schools around the country.

ESOFT has also partnered with the Ranaviru Seva Authority of the State Ministry of Defence and Ministry of Defence to offer scholarships and savings on course fees for members of the Armed Forces and their families.  The special loyalty card is known as Virusara Privilege, and was launched by the President Maithripala Sirisena.

In 2021, ESOFT launched an islandwide scholarship programme for IT and English, in partnership with the Ministry of Youth and Sports and the State Ministry of Digital Technology and Enterprise Development.  A total of 10,000 full scholarships and 20,000 half scholarships were awarded as part of this programme.

Awards & Recognitions 
 2012 - Awarded by Pearson (previously Edexcel) as the fastest developing centre in Sri Lanka. 
 2013 - Awarded as Gold Partner by Pearson, for the remarkable growth in student numbers and revenue.
 2014 - Awarded Gold by BCS for being the Best Centre 2013/2014 in the large scale sector, at the BCS Academy Awards.
 2014 - National Business Excellence Award in Education Services - Merit Award. 
 2015 - National Business Excellence Award in Education Services - Runners-up.
 2015 - Awarded as Gold Partner by Pearson, for the remarkable growth in student numbers and revenue.
 2016 - Awarded Gold by BCS for being the Best Centre 2015/2016 in the large scale sector, at the BCS Academy Awards held on 2016.10.16 at BMICH Colombo
 2016 - Awarded as Gold Partner by Pearson, for the remarkable growth in student numbers and revenue.
 2017 - Awarded as Platinum Partner by Pearson, for the high growth in student numbers and revenue, and being the market leader.  Awarded in 2018, for the year 2017.
 2018 - Awarded as Platinum Partner by Pearson for the second year running, for exceptional performance, and being the market leader.  Awarded in 2019, for the year 2018.
 2019 - Awarded as Platinum Partner by Pearson for the third year running.
 2019 - Awarded degree awarding powers and recognition as a Non-State Higher Education Institution by the Ministry of Education of Sri Lanka.
 2020 - Awarded as Platinum Partner by Pearson for the fourth consecutive year
 2020 - Chairman Dr Dayan Rajapakse received National and Provincial Gold Awards as the Entrepreneur of the Year, organised by the Federation of Chambers of Commerce of Sri Lanka
 2021 - Admitted as a member of the Association of Commonwealth Universities (ACU)
 2021 - ESOFT wins the ‘Best Education Institute’ award for ESOFT Digital Campus Mobile App at the South Asian Business Excellence Awards 2021

Branching Out 
ESOFT started expanding into regional areas in 2005 and then launched the Accelerated Expansion Project (AEP) to increase the total number of branches to 27 by the end of the year 2010, with more branches being opened thereafter

References

Educational institutions established in 2000
Universities and colleges in Colombo
2000 establishments in Sri Lanka